Frank Walter "Yip" Owens (January 25, 1886 – July 2, 1958) played the position of catcher for professional baseball teams in the American League in 1905 and 1909, and for teams in the Federal League in 1914 and 1915.

Sources

1886 births
1958 deaths
Baltimore Terrapins players
Baseball players from Toronto
Boston Americans players
Brooklyn Tip-Tops players
Chicago White Sox players
Canadian expatriate baseball players in the United States
Major League Baseball catchers
Major League Baseball players from Canada
Minor league baseball managers
Memphis Egyptians players
Minneapolis Millers (baseball) players